The  Asian Baseball Championship was the third continental tournament held by the Baseball Federation of Asia. The tournament was held in Tokyo, Japan for the first time. It was the second time Japan had won the tournament, and was the second of what would be three consecutive Asian Championship wins in a row. South Korea (2nd), Taiwan (3rd) and Philippines (4th) were the other participants.

References

Bibliography 
 

1959
Asian Baseball Championship
Asian Baseball Championship
Asian Baseball Championship
Sports competitions in Tokyo